Osadchy or Osadchyi is a Ukrainian surname. The feminine form is Osadcha or Osadchaya. The Belarusian forms are Asadchy and Asadchaya (Асадчая). Notable people with the surname include:

 Dmytro Osadchyi (disambiguation), several Ukrainian individuals
 Liliya Osadchaya (born 1953), Soviet-Ukrainian volleyball player
 Kateryna Osadcha (born 1983), Ukrainian journalist
 Maksim Osadchy (born 1965), Russian cinematographer
 Mykhaylo Osadchy (1936–1994), Ukrainian writer and dissident
 Natalya Osadcha-Yanata (1891–1982), Ukrainian botanist
 Nikolay Osadchy (born 1957), Russian politician
 Stanislav Osadchiy (born 1961), Russian ambassador
 Yan Osadchyi (born 1994), Ukrainian footballer

See also
 
 

Ukrainian-language surnames